Brush Creek is a creek in Mercer County, West Virginia, United States, which terminates in the Bluestone River near Eads Mill, West Virginia. 

The creek's most notable feature is Brush Creek Falls. With its  drop, it is the largest waterfall in Southern West Virginia. It is found in the Brush Creek Nature Preserve, a  area by the confluence of Brush Creek and the Bluestone River. The falls lies along County Route 3 and the Bluestone River to the north of the town of Athens of Mercer County.

References

Rivers of Mercer County, West Virginia